The 1996–97 season of the Norwegian Premier League, the highest bandy league for men in Norway.

10 games were played, with 2 points given for wins and 1 for draws. Stabæk won the league, whereas Frem-31 were relegated. Ahead of the next season, Drafn was renamed Drammen Bandy through a merger.

League table

References

Seasons in Norwegian bandy
1996 in bandy
1997 in bandy
Band
Band